The Bizet  is a domesticated breed of sheep originating from France.  It grows wool but is primarily raised for meat.  In 1952, the Bizet was introduced on the Kerguelen archipelago.  It is utilized as food for the scientific station there.

Characteristics
Rams have horns and ewes are polled (hornless). On average, rams weigh  and ewes . Ewes can lamb up to three times in two years.

History
The breed was developed between 1830 and 1900 by crossing first with the Caussenards breed, then with the Southdown and Dishley English breeds.  In 1905, steps were taken to start standardizing the breed.

References

Sheep breeds originating in France
Sheep breeds